Mark Gordon (born March 14, 1957) is an American politician who is the 33rd governor of Wyoming since January 7, 2019. A member of the Republican Party, he previously served as state treasurer; then-governor Matt Mead appointed him to that position on October 26, 2012, to fill the vacancy created by the death of Joseph Meyer.

Early life and education
Gordon was born in New York City, the son of Catherine (née Andrews) and Crawford Gordon. Gordon’s father grew up on Drumlin Farm, in Lincoln, Massachusetts. His parents married on October 27, 1945, at the First Unitarian Church of Kennebunk, Maine, before settling at their ranch in Kaycee, Wyoming, in 1947.

Gordon’s paternal grandmother was the philanthropist Louise Ayer Hatheway. His paternal great-grandfather was the industrialist and mill magnate Frederick Ayer, founder of the American Woolen Company, and younger brother of the patent medicine tycoon James Cook Ayer, both of Lowell, Massachusetts.

He is a nephew of the socialite Jean Gordon. Gordon is also a great-nephew by marriage of General George S. Patton, and a first cousin once removed of Major General George Patton IV. He was raised on his family's ranch in Johnson County, Wyoming. He earned a Bachelor of Arts degree in history from Middlebury College in 1979.

Career

2008 congressional run

In 2008, Gordon was an unsuccessful candidate in the Republican primary for the United States House of Representatives for Wyoming's at-large congressional district seat held by Barbara Cubin, who was retiring. His main opponent was Cynthia Lummis, also a former state treasurer and the wife of a Democratic former state representative, Alvin Wiederspahn. Former U.S. senator Alan K. Simpson of Cody, considered a moderate Republican, defended Gordon's candidacy but stopped short of an outright endorsement because he was also friendly with Lummis. Former U.S. senator Malcolm Wallop endorsed Gordon, as did the late Joseph B. Meyer, who was serving as state treasurer at the time.

In the primary, Gordon garnered the endorsements of Wyoming's two most prominent statewide newspapers, The Casper Star-Tribune and the Wyoming Tribune Eagle. Though polls and the financial advantage rested with Gordon in the primary campaign, he lost the nomination to Lummis.

Treasurer of Wyoming
Gordon was Treasurer of Wyoming from 2012 to 2019. He was sworn in as treasurer on November 1, 2012, by Wyoming Supreme Court Justice William Hill, after being selected by Governor Matt Mead.

Gordon was elected to a full term as treasurer in 2014.

Governor of Wyoming

2018 election

Gordon declined to run for Cynthia Lummis's seat in the U.S. House of Representatives in 2016, the one he ran for in 2008, and instead ran for governor of Wyoming in 2018. He won the Republican primary on August 21 and the general election on November 6, defeating Democratic state representative Mary Throne. Gordon was inaugurated on January 7, 2019.

2022 election

Gordon was reelected to a second term against Democratic nominee Theresa Livingston in the general election.

Tenure
Gordon was sworn in on January 7, 2019.

Amid a November 2020 spike in coronavirus cases, Gordon imposed some restrictions on indoor and outdoor public gatherings. He did not implement curfews, temporarily close any businesses or initially impose a statewide mask mandate. Gordon and his wife, Jennie Gordon, contracted COVID-19 later in the month. In December 2020, Gordon imposed a statewide mask mandate. In February 2021, he extended that order until the end of the month. On March 8, 2021, he announced that he would lift the mask mandate on March 16. On March 16, the mask mandate was lifted. As of March 30, Gordon has no plans to reinstate the mask mandate.

In November 2020, Gordon proposed $500 million in cuts to the Wyoming budget to account for declining revenue from the fossil fuel industry (particularly coal mining), which is crucial to Wyoming's economy. On April 2, 2021, he signed a budget passed by the Wyoming legislature that cut $430 million instead of the $500 million Gordon proposed, due to improved budget forecasts for the year of 2021 and supplemental money from the American Rescue Plan Act signed by President Biden. The budget Gordon signed decreases the amount cut to the University of Wyoming and the Wyoming Department of Health.

In 2021, a New York Times investigation revealed that Gordon had been targeted by hard-right conservatives, such as Susan Gore, the heiress to the Gore-Tex fortune. Gore funded secret operatives who targeted Gordon.

As of 2022, Gordon often polls as one of the nation's most popular governors.

Personal life
Gordon met his first wife, the former Sarah Hildreth Gilmore, at Middlebury College. They married on March 7, 1981, in the Second Congregational Church in Greenfield, Massachusetts, where her parents resided. In 1993, she died in an automobile accident. They had two daughters.

In 1998 Gordon met his current wife, the former Jennie Muir Young, and they married in 2000. Together they own the Merlin Ranch east of Buffalo in Johnson County, Wyoming. In 2009, their ranch received the Society for Range Management Wyoming Section "Excellence in Rangeland Stewardship" award.

On November 25, 2020, during the COVID-19 pandemic, Gordon tested positive for the virus on the same day his office was to be reopened after an employee of his had tested positive earlier. Gordon's office remained closed temporarily for deep-cleaning after his diagnosis.

Electoral history

References

External links

 Wyoming State Treasurer's Office
 

|-

|-

|-

|-

|-

1957 births
21st-century American politicians
Living people
Middlebury College alumni
People from Buffalo, Wyoming
People from Kaycee, Wyoming
Politicians from Cheyenne, Wyoming
Ranchers from Wyoming
Republican Party governors of Wyoming
School board members in Wyoming
St. Paul's School (New Hampshire) alumni
State treasurers of Wyoming
Wyoming Republicans
Candidates in the 2008 United States elections